The Aleutian Islands Wilderness is a wilderness area in the Aleutian Islands of the U.S. state of Alaska. It is part of the Aleutian Islands unit of Alaska Maritime National Wildlife Refuge.

External links
Wilderness.net - Aleutian Islands Wilderness
Recreation.gov - Aleutian Islands Wilderness
"Aleutian Islands: A Wilderness Ecosystem in Collapse" by Marla Cone, Philadelphia Inquirer, January 28, 2001

Protected areas of Aleutians West Census Area, Alaska
Wilderness areas of Alaska
Protected areas of Aleutians East Borough, Alaska 
Alaska Maritime National Wildlife Refuge